Chinoscopus is a genus of jumping spiders that was first described by Eugène Louis Simon in 1901.

Species
 it contains four species, found only in South America, Panama, and on Trinidad:
Chinoscopus ernsti (Simon, 1900) – Venezuela
Chinoscopus flavus (Peckham, Peckham & Wheeler, 1889) – Panama, Colombia
Chinoscopus gracilis (Taczanowski, 1872) (type) – Ecuador, Brazil, French Guiana
Chinoscopus maculipes Crane, 1943 – Trinidad, Venezuela, Brazil, Guyana, French Guiana, Ecuador

References

External links
 Photographs of C. gracilis

Salticidae
Salticidae genera
Spiders of South America